Agyneta canariensis is a species of sheet weaver found in the Canary Islands. It was described by Wunderlich in 1987.

References

canariensis
Spiders of the Canary Islands
Spiders described in 1987